Jacob Gabriel Gardiner-Smith (born 3 July 1997) is an English semi-professional footballer who plays as a midfielder for Southern Football League side Hanwell Town.

Early and personal life
Born in Cambridge, he is the grandson of Scottish footballer John Gardiner and the son of politician Barry Gardiner. He is fluent in Russian.

Career
He began his career with Russian sides CSKA Moscow and Zenit Saint Petersburg. After two years, he returned to England to sign for St Albans City, moving on to Hendon on dual-registration in January 2019. He turned professional with Wycombe Wanderers in July 2019.  He made his senior debut on 8 October 2019, in the EFL Trophy.  On 24 December 2019, he moved on a three-month long loan to Braintree Town.  

Gardiner-Smith was released by Wycombe Wanderers at the end of the 2019–20 season.  He signed for Hemel Hempstead Town in January 2022.  In August 2022, Gardiner-Smith was playing for National League South side Cheshunt.  After a spell with Kings Langley Gardiner-Smith signed for Southern Football League side Hanwell Town in January 2023.

References

1997 births
Living people
English footballers
PFC CSKA Moscow players
FC Zenit Saint Petersburg players
St Albans City F.C. players
Hanwell Town F.C. players
Hendon F.C. players
Wycombe Wanderers F.C. players
Braintree Town F.C. players
Association football midfielders
English expatriate footballers
Expatriate footballers in Russia
English people of Scottish descent
English expatriate sportspeople in Russia
Hemel Hempstead Town F.C. players
National League (English football) players
Cheshunt F.C. players
Kings Langley F.C. players